Aeonium ciliatum is a species of flowering plant in the family Crassulaceae that produces large green leaf rosettes, which can be  across. The rosettes emerge from a woody stem that branches freely and can become very top heavy. It is endemic to Tenerife in the Canary Islands, where it prefers some shade, and is frequent in the Anaga peninsula in the north east of the island.

References

Plants described in 1841
ciliatum